Kootingal railway station is located on the Main Northern line in New South Wales, Australia. It serves the town of Kootingal, opening on 9 January 1882 as Moonbi when the line was extended from West Tamworth. It was the terminus of the line until it was extended to Uralla on 2 August 1882. It was renamed Kootingal on 20 April 1914. Opposite the station lies a passing loop.

Services
Kootingal station is served by NSW TrainLink's daily Northern Tablelands Xplorer service operating between Armidale and Sydney.

References

External links
Kootingal station details Transport for New South Wales

Easy Access railway stations in New South Wales
Railway stations in Australia opened in 1882
Regional railway stations in New South Wales
Main North railway line, New South Wales
Kootingal, New South Wales